The Battle of Candespina was fought on 26 October 1110 or 1111 between the forces of Alfonso I of Aragon and those of his estranged wife, Urraca of León and Castile, in the Campo de la Espina near Sepúlveda. Alfonso was victorious, as he would be again in a few weeks at the Battle of Viadangos.

The battle was the result of a power struggle between Alfonso and Urraca. Perhaps the latter had become too powerful, for one of her strongest vassals, her brother-in-law Henry of Portugal, who had been recruiting soldiers in France (probably his native Burgundy), returned to ally with Alfonso after being promised a partition of the united realm that would leave him in control of the west (Galicia and Portugal).

Battle was joined while Urraca was staying in Burgos, the capital of Castile. On the field Urraca's suitor, Gómez González, the count of Castile, was killed by Henry. After the battle Urraca was joined in Burgos by the Castilian count Pedro González de Lara. Meanwhile, Henry of Portugal may have had second thoughts about his alliance with Alfonso. After the battle he was approached by some men of Urraca at Sepúlveda, where they offered him a better partition if he joined the queen. The Portuguese count's volte-face was leaked quickly, however, and the Aragonese forces retreated to Peñafiel. That "nearly impregnable fortress" was immediately besieged, unsuccessfully, by Henry and Urraca.

The date of the battle is reported differently in the early sources. The early narrative source called the Historia Compostelana gives the year as 1110. In support of this Luiz Gonzaga de Azevedo chronicled the career of Henry of Portugal, placing his trip to France in the early spring of 1110. He also cites the disappearance of Gómez González after 15 October 1110, the last time he appears in a contemporary document, and the appearance of a new count of Castile, Rodrigo Múñoz, in a document of Sahagún. The short account of the battle in the Annales Complutenses reads: 

The even shorter account in the Annales Compostellani reads: Era MCXLIX occiderunt comitem Gometium ("Era 1149 they killed count Gómez"). Likewise a document in the cartulary of Saint Sernin de Toulouse also dates the encounter to 1111.

References

Battles of the Reconquista
Battles involving Spain
1111 in Europe
Conflicts in 1111
12th century in Aragon
12th century in Castile